Zhao may refer to:

 Zhao (surname) (赵), a Chinese surname
 commonly spelled Chao in Taiwan or up until the early 20th century in other regions
 Chiu, from the Cantonese pronunciation
 Cho (Korean surname), represent the Hanja 趙 (Chinese: Zhao)
 Triệu, a Vietnamese surname which is the equivalent of the Mandarin Chinese surname Zhao (趙) 
 Zhao County, in Shijiazhuang, Hebei, China
 Zhao family (disambiguation)
 Zhao family (Internet slang), based on the surname Zhao, an internet term in China which refers to the ruling elite and the rich
 兆 (zhào), a Chinese numeral which usually represents 106 or 1012
Mega-, corresponding SI prefix in China, equals to 106
Tera-, corresponding SI prefix in Taiwan, equals to 1012
 Admiral Zhao, a character in the animated series Avatar: The Last Airbender

Chinese history
 Zhao (state) (403 BC–222 BC), a Warring States period state
 Triệu dynasty (204 BC–111 BC), or Zhao dynasty, the ruling house of the Nanyue state
 Zhao Kingdom (Han dynasty) (203 BC–213 AD), a kingdom or principality in the Han dynasty
 Former Zhao (304–329), or Han Zhao, a Sixteen Kingdoms state
 Later Zhao (319–351), a Sixteen Kingdoms state
 Zhao (Five Dynasties period) (910–921), a Five Dynasties period state
 House of Zhao (960–1279), the imperial clan of the Song Empire

See also
 Zhao Mausoleum (disambiguation)
 Chao (disambiguation)
 Zhou (disambiguation)